The 2013–14 Mid-American Conference men's basketball season began with practices in October 2013, followed by the start of the 2013–14 NCAA Division I men's basketball season in November. Conference play began in January 2014 and concluded in March 2014. Western Michigan and Toledo shared the regular season title with a conference record of 14–4. Top-seeded Western Michigan defeated Toledo in the MAC tournament final and represented the MAC in the NCAA tournament where they lost to Syracuse.

Preseason awards
The preseason poll and league awards were announced by the league office on October 29, 2013.

Preseason men's basketball poll
(First place votes in parenthesis)

East Division
 Akron 143 (18)
 Buffalo 120 (6)
 Ohio 94
 Kent State 91 (1)
 Miami 42
 Bowling Green 35

West Division
 Toledo 149 (24)
 Western Michigan 108
 Eastern Michigan 101 (1)
 Ball State 89
 Central Michigan 50
 Northern Illinois 28

Tournament champs
Akron (14), Toledo (7), Buffalo (1)

Honors

Postseason

Mid–American tournament

NCAA tournament

Postseason awards

Coach of the Year: Steve Hawkins, Western Michigan
Player of the Year: Javon McCrea, Buffalo
Freshman of the Year: Zavier Turner, Ball State
Defensive Player of the Year:  Da’Shonte Riley, Eastern Michigan
Sixth Man of the Year: Jake Kretzer, Akron

Honors

See also
 2013–14 Mid-American Conference women's basketball season

References